The archbishop of Kraków is the head of the archdiocese of Kraków. A bishop of Kraków first came into existence when the diocese was created in 1000; it was promoted to an archdiocese on 28 October 1925. Due to Kraków's role as Poland's political, cultural and spiritual center, the bishops and archbishops of Kraków were often very influential in the city, country and abroad. From 1443 to 1791, bishops of Kraków were simultaneously Dukes of Siewierz, although it was only Adam Stefan Sapieha who officially abandoned the title.

  Karol Mazurkiewicz

Auxiliary bishops 
Since 1303, the archdiocese of Kraków has frequently had one or more auxiliary bishops as well as the metropolitan bishop.

References

 
Bishops

Roman Catholic bishops of Kraków